Raheel Raza (born 1949–50) is a Pakistani-Canadian journalist, author, public speaker, media consultant, anti-racism activist, and interfaith discussion leader. She is among the most prominent Muslim supporters of Israel. She lives in Toronto, Ontario, Canada.

She is the author of Their Jihad, Not My Jihad: A Muslim Canadian Woman Speaks Out.  She opposes Islamic extremism.

She is an honorary associate of the National Secular Society

Early life
Raza is a Pakistani currently living in Canada.  She graduated from Karachi University with degrees in Psychology and English.  In 1989, she, her husband and her two sons  moved to Toronto.

Activism and political views

On Islam
She has unequivocally condemned the September 11th terrorist attacks and all terrorism and violence in the name of religion, as well as that done in the name of Islam specifically. She claims "radicals" have their own interpretation of Islam, and that the Qur'an does not justify suicide bombings.

She has said that hatred has been preached in places of worship in Canada and urges parents to be on the alert for extremism. Raza identifies herself as a libertarian.

Female-led mixed gender prayers
Raza has been a human rights activist, and has advocated gender equality, particularly for Muslim women. She became the first woman to lead mixed-gender Muslim prayers in Canada, in 2005. Raza termed it a "silent revolution" and said she hopes to become an imam someday. She also dreams of having a mosque "for women by women". She received death threats following the 2005 prayer event.

After female imam Amina Wadud received death threats for leading mixed-gender prayers in New York City, Raza was invited by Taj Hargey in 2008 to go to Oxford and become the first Muslim-born woman to lead a mixed-gender British congregation in Friday prayers. According to Muslim reformist Tahir Aslam Gora, such prayers did not become a regular practice. The Canadian Islamic Congress said Raza's concerns were a "non-issue for Canadian Muslims".

Opposition to prayers in schools
Raza opposed congregational Muslim Friday prayers in public schools,  saying that in 1988 the Ontario Court of Appeal ruled that the use of the Lord's Prayer in public schools was not appropriate. She said such prayers are contrary to the notion of separation of church and state. She called the prayers "discrimination and harassment" for requiring girls to pray at the back of the room and for disclosing their "private personal female condition".

Banning veils
Raza has argued for a public ban in Canada against the hijab and the burqa.

Opposition to Park51 Muslim community center

In August 2010 Raza, along with Tarek Fatah, both from the Muslim Canadian Congress, opposed the Muslim community center, Park51, located near the World Trade Center site (or Ground zero). She describes the project as a Fitna, meaning that it was done intentionally to provoke a reaction and make trouble.

In a Fox News interview with Bill O'Reilly she referred to Mayor Michael Bloomberg as having a "bleeding heart" for this cause that is actually dangerous for those who were affected by the 9/11 terror attacks, as the location of the Ground Zero Mosque seemed unnecessary and hurtful for the victims of the attacks.

On immigration
Raza has called the Canadian government to suspend all immigration from "terror-producing" countries, like Iran in 2012.

Organizations
Raza writes and records videos for the media websites Rebel News and True North Centre for Public Policy. She is a board member of and Director of Interfaith Affairs for the Muslim Canadian Congress.

She founded and is currently president of Forum for Learning, an interfaith discussion group. It is a non-profit organization.

In 2006, the National Muslim Christian Liaison Committee honoured her for promoting Muslim-Christian dialogue in the wake of the Pope Benedict controversy.

Donald Trump 
Raza stated in an interview with Bill Maher that Donald Trump was "an equal opportunity offender. And, secondly, this is supposed to be the First World, the civilized world, but he is really fudging that line about civility.". In a later article for USA Today, Raza wrote that "as politically incorrect as his language may be," Trump had "succeeded in sparking an international conversation about radical Islam that we must have now", and called for Trump to "step up and put moderate Muslims on stage."

Writing
Raza is a freelance writer. In 2000, she received an award from the Canadian Ethnic Journalists and Writers Club. She has lectured at York University on the portrayal of Muslims in the media.

Raza is the author of Their Jihad, Not My Jihad: a Muslim Canadian woman speaks out, a collection of her op-ed columns from the Toronto Star.  She is also a poet and a playwright.

Criticism 
Raza has been criticized for her support and involvement in anti-Muslim groups and policies. After the 2014 Saint-Jean-sur-Richelieu ramming attack, she stated in her blog that there needs to be a suspension of Muslim immigrants to Canada and that all mosques should be closed for three months and claimed that this action would not be an abuse of religious freedom. Her support and association with groups and projects described as anti-Muslim like the Clarion Project and ACT! for America which have funded and aided anti-Muslim legislations and policies within the USA has also been criticized. She has been criticized as being "far from the "reformist" and "progressive" individual she claims to be, Raza's extensive history of anti-Muslim statements and open ties to hate groups make her fundamentally undemocratic."

Works

Books
How Can You Possibly be an Anti-Terrorist Muslim?, Raheel Raza, Possibly Publishing, 2011 
Their Jihad... Not My Jihad: Revised 2nd Edition, Raheel Raza, Possibly Publishing, 2012 
How Can You Possibly be a Muslim Feminist?, Raheel Raza, Possibly Publishing, 2014 
The ABC's of Islamism: Everything you wanted to know about radical Islam, but were afraid to ask, Raheel Raza, Library and Archives Canada, 2020

Documentary film
Raza participated, together with eight other women's rights activists, in the documentary film Honor Diaries which explores the issues of  gender-based violence and inequality in Muslim-majority societies. Her personal story was featured alongside those of the other activists, all of whom are working to combat gender prejudice that is embedded in honor-based societies.

Select articles
"Flavours of a desi Christmas; For Canada's South Asian Christians, Christmas is a festive time full of unique traditions – especially when it comes to food", Raheel Raza, the Toronto Star, December 13, 2007
"In the Arms of Extremists", Raheel Raza, Ottawa Citizen, December 28, 2007
"Steeped in superstition; When folklore, traditions and imagination intersect, the resulting beliefs are something even educated people take seriously", Raheel Riza, the Toronto Star, March 19, 2008
"'Islamophobia' used too often to stifle debate or criticism", Raheel Riza, The Vancouver Sun, June 17, 2008
"Mischief in Manhattan; We Muslims know the Ground Zero mosque is meant to be a deliberate provocation", Raheel Raza and Tarek Fatah, Ottawa Citizen, August 7, 2010

See also
Criticism of Islamism
Islamic feminism
List of fatwas

References

External links
Official website
Facebook page

1949 births
21st-century Canadian poets
21st-century Canadian women writers
Canadian human rights activists
Women human rights activists
Canadian journalists
Canadian libertarians
Pakistani emigrants to Canada
Naturalized citizens of Canada
Canadian women poets
Canadian political writers
Canadian women's rights activists
Canadian writers of Asian descent
Canadian feminists
Living people
University of Karachi alumni
Writers from Toronto
Pakistani libertarians
Canadian women non-fiction writers
Former Muslims turned agnostics or atheists
Former Muslim critics of Islam